Eugène Klein (born in 1916 in Avenheim) was a French clergyman and bishop for the Roman Catholic Diocese of Bereina in Papua New Guinea. 

He was appointed Bishop of Bereina  in 1966. He was Archbishop of the Roman Catholic Archdiocese of Nouméa in New Caledonia from 1972 until he resigned in 1981. He died in 1992.

References 

1916 births
1992 deaths
French Roman Catholic bishops
Roman Catholic bishops of Bereina
Roman Catholic archbishops of Nouméa